Dawu Clay Sculpture (Teochew: 涂安仔, Tu Ang Zai) is a famous folk art in Chaozhou, Guangdong Province. It is called "Three Chinese Clay Sculpture" because it is made with Clay Figure Zhang and Xihui mountain clay.

History 
It has a history of more than 700 years, with the Qing Dynasty being the most prosperous time for Dawu Clay Sculpture.

Artistic Attractiveness 
Styles of makeup in drama is one of the main breeds of Dawu Clay Sculpture, another main breed is the whole body of character of drama.

Gallery

References

Chinese pottery
Teochew culture